Chamindu Wijesinghe (born 3 September 2000) is a Sri Lankan cricketer. He made his Twenty20 debut on 4 March 2021, for Colombo Cricket Club in the 2020–21 SLC Twenty20 Tournament. Prior to his Twenty20 debut, he was named in Sri Lanka's squad for the 2020 Under-19 Cricket World Cup. He made his List A debut on 24 March 2021, for Colombo Cricket Club in the 2020–21 Major Clubs Limited Over Tournament.

References

External links
 

2000 births
Living people
Sri Lankan cricketers
Colombo Cricket Club cricketers
Place of birth missing (living people)